Dušan Bublavý  (born 4 April 1964 in Častkovce) is a Slovak politician, who served as a member of the National Council in 2010-2020. Since 2006, he has been the mayor of his home village of Častkovce. He is a member of Direction – Slovak Social Democracy party.

References 

Direction – Social Democracy politicians
Living people
1964 births
Members of the National Council (Slovakia) 2010-2012
Members of the National Council (Slovakia) 2012-2016
Members of the National Council (Slovakia) 2016-2020
People from Nové Mesto nad Váhom District